Kingsley Sokari (born 30 May 1995) is a Nigerian footballer who plays as a midfielder for Pharco FC and the Nigeria national team. Nicknamed "new Iniesta" he has been lauded as the most promising central midfielder in the Nigerian Premier Football League. Sokari is only the second Nigerian player to play for the U20, U23 team and full national team in the same year  after Ahmed Musa in 2011.

Club career
Kingsley Sokari burst onto the scene with Enyimba during the 2013-2014 season. After signing as a youth player following a recruitment exercise in 2013, he was immediately promoted to the first team and would play an integral part in helping the Aba Millionaires compete in the national league and the CAF African Champions League. During the season, he integrated well into the team forming a vital partnership with teammates providing numerous assists in vital games.

Enyimba F.C (2013-)
Handed his home debut against perennial rivals Heartland, Sokari warmed his way into Enyimba fans by scoring the deciding goal from a freekick. He would score his second league goal away against Kaduna Utd in a superb solo effort to cap his Man of the match performance.  Kingsley was named the NPFL Young player of the year at the end of his first season (2014) and was also nominated for League Bloggers' Player of the season award.

CS Sfaxien (2015)
The 21-year-old Nigeria U-23 international, Sokari joined the 2013 CAF Confederation Cup winners CS Sfaxien in December 2015 on a three-and-half year deal from Enyimba FC for an undisclosed sum. He scored his second goal for the club in the 49th minute of the match that ended in a 3-1 win over Stade Tunisien. He wears the number 20 jersey for the club.

Pharco FC

On 9 August 2021, sokari joined Egyptian club Pharco FC on free transfer on a three year deal.

International career
Following his performances in the NPFL in 2014, Sokari was noticed by the national team handlers. He was invited to train with the U-20 team in preparation for the AYC 2015; played for the U-23 side coached by Samson Siasia and earned his senior cap for the Nigerian national team in a friendly in January 2015.  Sokari started the 2015 U-20 World cup game against North Korea, scoring a scorcher from 25 yards for the 3rd goal of the game.

Honours

Club
Enyimba: 

NPFL 2014 – Runners Up
NPFL 2015 – Champions

Individual
NPFL Young Player of the Year 2014

References

  http://www.goal.com/en-ng/news/4078/exclusives/2015/06/19/12861062/tunisian-club-esperance-seals-400000-kingsley-sokari
 

1995 births
Living people
Nigerian footballers
Nigeria Professional Football League players
Association football forwards
Enyimba F.C. players
Nigeria international footballers
Nigeria under-20 international footballers
African Games bronze medalists for Nigeria
African Games medalists in football
Competitors at the 2015 African Games